Li Huahua (born 29 October 1962) is a Chinese fencer. She competed at the 1984 and 1988 Summer Olympics. After retirement from competitions, Li moved to Canada and started a fencing club in Richmond Hill, Ontario in 2011.

References

External links
 

1962 births
Living people
Chinese female fencers
Olympic fencers of China
Fencers at the 1984 Summer Olympics
Fencers at the 1988 Summer Olympics
Asian Games medalists in fencing
Fencers at the 1986 Asian Games
Asian Games gold medalists for China
Medalists at the 1986 Asian Games